The 1330s was a decade of the Julian Calendar which began on January 1, 1330, and ended on December 31, 1339.

Significant people

References